Jeffrey Robert Trott is an American songwriter/producer and multi-instrumentalist who has collaborated with prominent artists across genres in the United States and abroad. Trott has been named BMI Songwriter of the Year.

He is known for writing many hits with Grammy winning artist Sheryl Crow, "If It Makes You Happy," "Every Day is a Winding Road," "My Favorite Mistake," "Soak Up The Sun," and "Good Is Good" as well as the Top 10 Billboard Country single "Easy" from her 2013 album Feels Like Home. He has produced tracks on her multi-platinum albums C'mon, C'mon and Wildflower, also co-writing and producing Crow's 2017 album Be Myself. Trott also appears on Crow's most recent album Threads that was released in 2019 - credited as a songwriter, producer and musician.

In 2019 Trott produced, wrote and performed on the Hootie and the Blowfish album Imperfect Circle. The band's first new album in 14 years. The album was met with positive reviews.<ref>{{Cite web|url=https://www.billboard.com/articles/news/8529158/hootie-the-blowfish-imperfect-circle|title=Hootie & the Blowfish Reveals 'Imperfect Circle' Track List, Shares 'Rollin: Exclusive|website=Billboard|access-date=2020-01-07}}</ref>

 Early years 
Trott's roots are West Coast. He got his start in San Francisco where his band was post punk outfit The Lifers. He then went on to join 415/Columbia recording artists Wire Train and in 1990 subsequently joined the UK band cult favorite World Party playing on their critically acclaimed album Goodbye Jumbo.

Career
 Writing 
Trott's songwriting collaborations including Gemma Hayes, Colbie Caillat, Jason Mraz, John Paul White of The Civil Wars, Augustana, Rob Thomas, Guster, Natasha Bedingfield, Michelle Branch, Meiko, Liz Phair, Roger Daltry for The Who, Joe Cocker, Stevie Nicks, Counting Crows, Marc Broussard, Holly Conlan, Cider Sky and many others. Trott wrote "I'll Be Your Doctor" for Joe Cocker on his latest record Fire it Up . Producing 
In 2015, Trott produced an album with actress/singer songwriter Leighton Meester from "Gossip Girl" and the movie Country Strong. The album was named "Heartstrings". Producer credits include Sheryl Crow, Stevie Nicks, San Diego rock band Augustana, Joshua Radin's Wax Wings, Meiko, Griffin House, Pete Francis from Dispatch. In 2009, Trott produced the Samantha Stollenwerk record "Carefree". "Carefree" was recorded with members of Beck's band -Joey Waronker, Justin Meldal-Johnsen, Brian LeBarton, Lyle Workman and Roger Manning. Trott also produced Max Gomez's latest record "Rule the World" featuring the single "Run from You" with a video directed by Keifer Sutherland. Randy Jackson chose Trott to produce his musical ensemble venture, The Canyons. Trott and Frank Rogers co-produced 2019's Imperfect Circle by Hootie & the Blowfish.

 Movie and television 
Trott produced the soundtrack for the indie movie "Janie Jones" featuring Abigail Breslin and Alessandro Nivola. He also scored the Kevin Watkins short film animation, "Hose".

Trott was nominated for an Emmy Award for writing and producing the theme song for the Katie Couric talk show The Katie Show. His songs have gotten many placements in hit television shows like Parenthood, Grey's Anatomy, as well as songs in American Idol, The Voice, and The X Factor.

 Solo project 
In 2000, Trott recorded and produced his first solo album, Dig Up The Astroturf, with Portland electronic whiz kid Keith Schreiner. It was released on Trott's own indie label Black Apple. Trott's reason for making a solo record was to understand "every aspect of making a record, mastering, artwork, branding and PR in order to know firsthand what an artist goes through during the process of making a record."

 ole-2016 
In January 2016, Trott signed a publishing and catalogue purchase agreement with rights management company ole.

Accolades
 BMI Songwriter Award 
The BMI Awards are annual award ceremonies for songwriters in various genres organized by Broadcast Music, Inc. The main pop music award was founded in 1952. The 63rd Annual BMI Pop Awards were held at the Beverly Wilshire Hotel in Beverly Hills, California, on May 13, 2015.

 Daytime Emmy Awards 
The Daytime Emmy Awards are awards presented by the New York–based National Academy of Television Arts and Sciences and the Los Angeles–based Academy of Television Arts & Sciences in recognition of excellence in American daytime television programming. Jeff Trott and Sheryl Crow have received one nomination in the category "Outstanding Original Song".

 Grammy Awards 

 Discography 

 Sheryl Crow 

 1996 
Sheryl Crow- Sheryl Crow (album)

 1998 
Sheryl Crow- 'The Globe Sessions'

 2002 
Sheryl Crow- C'mon C'mon

 2005 
Sheryl Crow- Wildflower

 2008 
Sheryl Crow- Detours

 2013 
Sheryl Crow- Feels Like Home2017Sheryl Crow - Be Myself2019'Sheryl Crow- Threads Counting Crows 

 2002 
Counting Crows- Hard Candy Marc Broussard 

 2004 
Marc Broussard – Carencro Augustana 

 2011 
Augustana – Augustana Joe Cocker 

 2012 
Joe Cocker – Fire It Up Hootie and the Blowfish 

 2019 
Hootie and the Blowfish – 'Imperfect Circle'

 Others 
 1990 Goodbye Jumbo, World Party
 2001 Trouble in Shangri-La, Stevie Nicks
 2005 ...Something to Be, Rob Thomas
 2005 The Forgotten Arm, Aimee Mann
 2005 ...Something More, Rob Thomas
 2009 Keep the Faith'', Toni Childs

References 

Year of birth missing (living people)
Living people
People from San Mateo, California
American male singer-songwriters
American multi-instrumentalists
Record producers from California
American singer-songwriters